Russell family may refer to:
Clan Russell of Scotland, with connections to the Dukes of Bedford
Russell family, an English aristocratic family headed by the Duke of Bedford
Russell family, British aristocracy, who were created baronets
Russell family (American political family), a Georgia family whose members have held prominent positions in the state government and U.S. government
Russell family (Passions), a fictional family on Passions

See also 
 Russell (surname)